Pettis is a surname. Notable people with the name include:

Anthony Pettis (born 1987), American mixed martial artist
Austin Pettis (born 1989), American football wide receiver
Billy James Pettis (1913–1979), American mathematician
Bre Pettis (born 1972/1973), American entrepreneur, video blogger and multi-artist
Bridget Pettis (born 1971), American basketball player
Dante Pettis (born 1995), American football player
Dianne Ruth Pettis (1955–2008), New Zealand novelist and journalist
Garret Pettis (born 1989), American soccer player
Gary Pettis (born 1958), American baseball player
Jerry Pettis (1916–1975), American politician
Jill Pettis (born 1952), New Zealand politician
Madison Pettis (born 1998), American actress and model
Mark Pettis (born 1950), American politician from Wisconsin
Michael Pettis (born 1958), American economist
Pierce Pettis (born 1954), American singer-songwriter
Sergio Pettis (born 1993), American mixed martial artist, brother of Anthony
Shirley Neil Pettis (1924–2016), U.S. Representative from California, wife of Jerry
Solomon Newton Pettis (1827–1900), American politician
Spencer Darwin Pettis (1802–1831), U.S. Representative from Missouri
Will Pettis (born 1977), Arena football wide receiver, defensive back

See also
Pettis (disambiguation)